Khordogoy (Xordoğoy) is a rural locality (a selo), the administrative centre of and one of two settlements, in addition to Oyusut, in Vilyuchansky Rural Okrug of Suntarsky District in the Sakha Republic, Russia. Located  from Suntar, it is the administrative center of the district. Khordogoy's population as of the 2002 Census was 819.

References

Notes

Sources
Official website of the Sakha Republic. Registry of the Administrative-Territorial Divisions of the Sakha Republic. Suntarsky District. 

Rural localities in Suntarsky District